Ulysses J. Lincoln Peoples (February 1865 - after 1940) was an American architect based in Pittsburgh, Pennsylvania.  Five schools located in Pittsburgh, Pennsylvania that were designed by Peoples have listed on the National Register of Historic Places.

Peoples was born in Pennsylvania in 1865.  He was the son of William Peoples, a stair builder.  At the time of the 1870 United States Census, Peoples was living with his parents and three siblings in Allegheny, Pennsylvania.  At the time of the 1880 United States Census, Peoples was living in Chester, Pennsylvania.  At the time of the 1900 United States Census, Peoples was living in Pittsburgh with his wife Emma and daughter Edith.  By the time of the 1910 Census, Peoples also had a son Ulysses, Jr.  He remained in Pittsburgh at the time of the 1920 and 1930 Censuses.  By the time of the 1940 Census, Peoples and his wife Emma had relocated to Uniontown, Pennsylvania, where both were employed as taxi cab dispatchers.

Peoples' works include:
Larimer School, Larimer Avenue at Winslow Street, Pittsburgh, Pennsylvania, NRHP-listed
Madison Elementary School, Milwaukee and Orion Streets, Pittsburgh, Pennsylvania, NRHP-listed 
McCleary Elementary School, Holmes Street and McCandless Avenue, Pittsburgh, Pennsylvania, NRHP-listed
Oakland Public School, Dawson Street near Edith Place, Pittsburgh, Pennsylvania, NRHP-listed
Wightman School (1897), (now Wightman School Community Building), 5604 Solway Street, Pittsburgh, Pennsylvania, NRHP-listed

References

American architects
1865 births
1940s deaths